Parastrophics is a studio album by German electronica duo Mouse on Mars. It was released by Monkeytown Records in 2012.

Critical reception
At Metacritic, which assigns a weighted average score out of 100 to reviews from mainstream critics, Parastrophics received an average score of 74% based on 22 reviews, indicating "generally favorable reviews".

Heather Phares of AllMusic gave the album 4 stars out of 5, calling it "an album that's a rebirth and a welcome return for one of electronic music's most restlessly creative acts." Matthew Perpetua of Rolling Stone gave the album 3.5 stars out of 5, describing it as "a surreal pop record that gleefully warps the tones and inflections of modern radio tunes into funhouse mirror abstractions."

PopMatters placed it at number 4 on the "Best Electronic Music of 2012" list, as well as number 10 on the "Top 10 Pleasant Surprise Albums of 2012" list.

Track listing

Personnel
Credits adapted from liner notes.

 Jan St. Werner – writing, lyrics (5)
 Andi Toma – writing, lyrics (5)
 Dodo Nkishi – lyrics (3, 5)
 Ya Tosiba – lyrics, vocals (12)
 Esther Grimaldi – vocals (1)
 Steven Jo – vocals (2)

References

External links
 
 

2012 albums
Mouse on Mars albums